Bari Dreiband-Burman is an American make-up artist. She was nominated for an Academy Award in the category Best Makeup and Hairstyling for the film Scrooged. Dreiband-Burman also won five Primetime Emmy Awards and was nominated for eighteen more in the category Outstanding Makeup.

Selected filmography 
 Scrooged (1988; co-nominated with Thomas R. Burman)

References

External links 

Living people
Year of birth missing (living people)
Place of birth missing (living people)
American make-up artists
Primetime Emmy Award winners